The Chaneysville Incident is a 1981 novel by David Bradley. The novel won the 1982 PEN/Faulkner Award for Fiction. It concerns a black historian who investigates an incident involving the death of his father and a prior incident involving the death of some 12 slaves. John, the historian, struggles to solve the mystery of his father, Moses Washington, a moonshiner with a troubled past. Imagination, hunting, death, and racial tensions all make thematic appearances in the novel. Chaneysville is in Bedford County, Pennsylvania.

1981 novels
Bedford County, Pennsylvania
Novels about American slavery
Novels set in Pennsylvania
Harper & Row books
PEN/Faulkner Award for Fiction-winning works